Roald Zinnurovich Sagdeev (born 26 December 1932) is a Russian expert in plasma physics and a former director of the Space Research Institute of the USSR Academy of Sciences. He was also a science advisor to the Soviet President Mikhail Gorbachev. Sagdeev graduated from Moscow State University. He is a member of both the Russian Academy of Sciences and the American Philosophical Society. He has worked at the University of Maryland, College Park since 1989 in the University of Maryland College of Computer, Mathematical, and Natural Sciences.  He is also currently a Senior Advisor at the Albright Stonebridge Group, a global strategy firm, where he assists clients with issues involving Russia and countries in the former Soviet Union. Sagdeev was married to, and divorced from, Susan Eisenhower, granddaughter of Dwight D. Eisenhower.  Sagdeev was the recipient of the 2003 Carl Sagan Memorial Award, and the James Clerk Maxwell Prize for Plasma Physics (2001).

Early years
Roald Sagdeev is an ethnic Tatar. His maternal grandfather was a secular man teaching mathematics. He was born in Moscow on December 26, 1932, soon after the arrival of his young parents from Tatarstan. The family used to speak Russian at home. Nonetheless, the parents also communicated in Tatar between adults when secrecy was needed. He lived with them until the age of four near the Nikitsky Gates. His father was then a post-graduate student. He spent the following years in Kazan where he graduated from a high school. The young Roald was not only a quite outstanding student who was awarded the Silver Medal, but also champion of chess among juniors of his city. His brother Renad Zinnurovich Sagdeev (born December 13, 1941) would later study chemistry. Roald returned to Moscow to study at the Moscow State University. He was one of a few of Lev Landau's students, the Soviet Nobel laureate. In the dormitory he lived next to Mikhail Gorbachev, a law student, and Raisa Gorbachyova, a sociology student.

As a researcher
In 1955, after graduating from  Moscow State University in nuclear science, Doctorate in Physics and Mathematics, he worked at the Kurchatov Institute of Atomic Energy as a member of the controlled fusion team,  with Igor Kurchatov as director from 1956 to 1961. From 1961 until 1970, he worked as head of the Laboratory at the Institute of Nuclear Physics of the Siberian Division of the USSR Academy of Sciences in Novosibirsk.

At the age of 35, he was one of the youngest persons ever  elected as a full academician of the Academy of Sciences of the USSR. From 1970 until 1973, he worked at the Institute of Physics of High Temperatures of the USSR Academy of Sciences. His works on the behavior of hot plasma and controlled thermonuclear fusion in both the Institute of Atomic Energy and later at the Institute of Nuclear Physics have won international recognition.

Director of the Space Research Institute
Upon his return to Moscow, he was appointed the director of the Space Research Institute of the USSR Academy of Sciences. He stayed at this post from 1973 until 1988. There he supervised several research projects such as the Cosmos, Forecast, Intercosmos, Meteor, and Astron programs.

He managed or was a principal participant in many space projects including the Venera probes to Venus, the joint Soviet-U.S. Soyuz Apollo Test Project and headed the International Space Project Venus-Halley (Vega) and Phobos projects.

He is the author of studies on plasma physics and magnetofluiddynamics. In 1984,  he was awarded the most prestigious Lenin Prize for his outstanding achievements in the foundations of the neoclassical theory of transport processes in toroidal plasma.

Role in repressions against dissidents
In 1968 a few dozens of Soviet citizens signed a number of letters addressed to the Soviet government in which the authors protested against human rights violations by the authorities in connection with the trials of Soviet dissidents. The authorities initiated repressions against the signatories, including those who worked at the research establishments of Akademgorodok in Novosibirsk. Then 36-year-old Sagdeev suggested that these persons should be dismissed from Akademgorodok and sent to "load chunks of lead".

Role in politics
As Yuri Andropov became the new General Secretary of the Communist Party of the Soviet Union, Sagdeev participated in the work of a think tank with Gorbachev as the head, which was mandated to find scientific justifications for the nuclear disarmament. Later, as Gorbachev became the new General Secretary of the Communist Party of the Soviet Union, following Ronald Reagan's Strategic Defense Initiative (SDI), they advised the Soviet leadership not to worry and not to respond by creating a similar program.

He was awarded the title of the Hero of Socialist Labor for his role in the international research program of the  Halley Comet  in 1986.

He was elected at the Supreme Soviet of the USSR in 1987 and worked until 1991 as an advisor on the issues related to civil and military space problems for Mikhail Gorbachev and Eduard Shevardnadze on summits, which were held in Geneva (1985), in Washington, D.C. (1987) and in Moscow (1988).

Personal life
Sagdeev met Susan Eisenhower, a step-grandmother, and the twice divorced mother of three daughters, in 1987, at a US–USSR forum in New York City. Eisenhower is the granddaughter of Dwight D. Eisenhower 34th President of the United States, and a political scientist by profession. They rendezvoused later in Russia, the US, and various European countries before they married in 1990. Thus, he moved to live in the US.  As of 2008 they are divorced.

Post-Cold War
Today, Sagdeev is a Distinguished Professor of Physics at the University of Maryland, College Park, member of the US National Academy and the Royal Swedish Academy of Sciences. Sagdeev is also a member of the Supervisory Council of the International Luxembourg Forum on Preventing Nuclear Catastrophe.  He is also currently a Senior Advisor at the Albright Stonebridge Group, a global strategy firm, where he assists clients with issues involving Russia and countries in the former Soviet Union.

References

External links

1932 births
Living people
Soviet physicists
20th-century Russian physicists
Tatar people
Academic staff of the Moscow Institute of Physics and Technology
Eisenhower family
University of Maryland, College Park faculty
Lenin Prize winners
Heroes of Socialist Labour
Communist Party of the Soviet Union members
Soviet politicians
Full Members of the USSR Academy of Sciences
Full Members of the Russian Academy of Sciences
Members of the Pontifical Academy of Sciences
Place of birth missing (living people)
Foreign associates of the National Academy of Sciences
Members of the Royal Swedish Academy of Sciences